The 1972–73 United Counties League season was the 66th in the history of the United Counties League, a football competition in England. At the end of the previous season leagues top division was renamed Premier Division, while lower divisions was renamed Division One and Division Two.

Premier Division

The Premier Division featured 14 clubs which competed in the division last season, along with two new clubs:
Long Buckby, promoted from old Division Two
Stamford, transferred from the Midland League

League table

Division One

The previous season Division Two changed name to Division One before this season. The Division One featured 17 clubs which competed in the Division Two last season, along with 2 new clubs:
Eynesbury Rovers, relegated from old Division One
V S Rugby, promoted from old Division Three

League table

Division Two

The previous season Division Three changed name to Division Two before this season. The Division Two featured 18 clubs which competed in the Division Three last season, no new clubs joined the division this season.

League table

References

External links
 United Counties League

1972–73 in English football leagues
United Counties League seasons